The 2010–11 Leyton Orient F.C. season was the 112th season in the history of Leyton Orient Football Club, their 95th in the Football League, and fifth consecutive season in the third tier of the English football league system.

Playing staff
Statistics include only League, FA Cup and League Cup appearances and goals. Correct as of the end of the 2010–11 season. Players' ages as of 7 August 2010.

Pre-season friendlies

JOMA Cup

League One

Results by round

Football League Cup

FA Cup

Johnstone's Paint Trophy

2010–11 squad statistics
Figures in brackets indicate appearances as a substitute
Players in italics are loan players

Top scorers

Pre-season trialists
This is a list of players who went on trial with Orient during the pre-season programme, but did not sign contracts.

References

Further reading

Leyton Orient
Leyton Orient F.C. seasons